Villa Devoto is a neighborhood or district located in the northwestern area of the city of Buenos Aires, Argentina. Its administrative limits are defined by Lope de Vega, General Paz, San Martín, and Francisco Beiró Avenues; and Joaquín V. González, Baigorría, and Campana streets.

Villa Devoto, a primarily middle class to upscale neighborhood, is characterized by quiet tree-lined streets and is often considered as The Garden of Buenos Aires. A lower-density, wealthy residential subsection known as Devoto R is located around Arenales Square, in the ward's north-central section.

Villa Devoto is served by the FC Urquiza and FC San Martín commuter railway lines.

History

Part of General San Martín Partido until the Federalization of Buenos Aires, the area was an exurb at the time and was known as Villa Gainza y Lynch. A rail link was built by the Buenos Aires and Pacific Railway, which inaugurated Devoto Station in 1888.

The district was named after Count Antonio Devoto, who became the landowner of most of the present day district in 1904. The Count Devoto was a member of the elite of Buenos Aires. King Victor Emmanuel III of Italy granted Devoto the title of count in 1916 in gratitude for his assistance to the Kingdom of Italy during World War I; Devoto died a few months later.

Devoto owned one of the largest mansions of Buenos Aires, known as Devoto Palace. The mansion was built by Italian architect Juan Antonio Buschiazzo, its 10,000 m² (107,000 ft²) decorated in bronze, silver and gold with ironwork forged in Italy, as well as Florentine mosaics. Prince Umberto di Savoia stayed there during a state visit in 1924. Devoto died before Buschiazzo's work was complete, and the mansion was demolished around 1940. He did not leave any descendants, and his remains lie at the Basílica of San Antonio de Padua in Villa Devoto.

The Metropolitan Seminary of Buenos Aires, alma mater to many of Argentina's bishops and archbishops, was established in Villa Devoto in 1899; among its alumni was the future Pope Francis. The Devoto Penitentiary, the city's sole remaining jail, was established in 1927. The ward became a bedroom community in later decades, as well as home to a sizable English Argentine and American expatriate community; a Garden Club was established by the English-speaking community in 1978.

Sports 

Villa Devoto is home to the General Lamadrid soccer club.

Landmarks

Personalities

Jorge Bergoglio, the 266th and current Pope of the Catholic Church studied in 1958 at the Metropolitan Seminary of Villa Devoto. 
The following have all been residents of Villa Devoto:
Olegario Víctor Andrade, poet
Josemaría Listorti, TV comedian
Diego Maradona, footballer
Mario Pergolini, TV producer
Gabriela Sabatini, tennis player

See also 

 Antonio Devoto
 Devoto Palace

External links

The Portal Of Villa Devoto (Spanish)
Devoto Info (Spanish)
Devoto News (Spanish)
 Devoto Barrio (Spanish)
 Devoto Hoy Portal (Spanish)
 Info on Devoto (Spanish)

Neighbourhoods of Buenos Aires